The Peace Center is a performing arts center located in Greenville, South Carolina. It is composed of a concert hall, theater, and amphitheatre. Located adjacent to Falls Park, the center hosts over 300 events each year, including classical music, Broadway shows, and appearances by popular artists such as David Copperfield.

About

The Peace Center is named after the local Peace family who donated $10 million towards its development. The center was opened in 1990 and is built on the former site of three dilapidated factories - one building wagons for the Confederate Army, a textile plant built in the 1880s, and a building serving as the home for Duke's Mayonnaise.
There are four resident companies: Greenville Symphony Orchestra, Carolina Ballet Theatre, South Carolina Children's Theater, and the International Ballet.  In January 2004, the Peace Center hosted a debate among Democratic presidential candidates.  In May 2011, it was the site of the first Republican debate for the 2012 presidential election.  In February 2016, it was the site of the ninth Republican debate for the 2016 presidential election.

The TD Stage at the Peace Center (formerly the Peace Center Amphitheater) opened September 12, 2012, hosting Vince Gill. The night started with Mayor Knox White and TD executives hosting a ribbon cutting ceremony. Seating capacity is projected to be 1,400+. Patrons are able to sit along the tiered seat-walls or use blankets or lawn chairs in the open-seating areas.

The Brian Setzer Orchestra performed at the Peace Center in '06 for their Christmas Rocks Tour, and also played some of their hits like "Jump, Jive, and Wail".

External links
 Peace Center - Official website of the Peace Center.
 Peace Center History - History of this building from before it was built to its current standing.
 Greenville Symphony Orchestra

References

Landmarks in South Carolina
Buildings and structures in Greenville, South Carolina
Theatres in South Carolina
Tourist attractions in Greenville, South Carolina